Whistler Nunatak is a nunatak lying west of Mount Mende in the Sky-Hi Nunataks, Palmer Land. Named in 1987 by Advisory Committee on Antarctic Names (US-ACAN) in reference to the whistler effect caused by amplitude change of radio signals in the upper atmosphere and in association with names of upper atmosphere researchers grouped in the area.

Nunataks of Palmer Land